The flat leaf sponge (Isodictya grandis) is a species of marine demosponge in the family Isodictyidae. This sponge is known from the west coast of South Africa to False Bay. It is endemic to this region.

Description 
The flat leaf sponge may grow to 1 cm thick and 20 cm high. It is an erect, thin-bladed sponge, with the blades narrowing to points at the tips. Its texture is smooth but slightly hairy with small oscula on the blade edges. It is orange-red in colour.

Habitat 
This sponge lives on rocky reefs from 15-37m.

References

Poecilosclerida
Sponges described in 1886